The 1953 Torud earthquake occurred at the northeastern border of the Great Salt Kavir in Torud, Semnan, Iran on 12 February. The shock had a moment magnitude of 6.6 and had a maximum Mercalli intensity of VIII (Severe). At least 800 people were killed.

See also
List of earthquakes in 1953
List of earthquakes in Iran

References

Sources

External links

1953 earthquakes
1953 in Iran
Earthquakes in Iran
History of Semnan Province
1953 disasters in Iran